Detective Aiden Burn is a fictional character on the CBS crime drama CSI: NY portrayed by Vanessa Ferlito. Ferlito starred in the first season of the series, and appeared sporadically throughout the series' second season.

Overview
Aiden Burn is a Brooklyn native who has the ability to adapt to new situations very quickly and has a love and drive for her job similar to that of Sara Sidle on CSI: Crime Scene Investigation.

She is dismissed from the team in season two, episode 2 ("Grand Murder at Central Station") after becoming obsessed with a rape case concerning her friend Regina Bowen who had first been attacked offscreen sometime in 2003 as it was explained the second rape in 2005 came 18 months after the initial attack.  Regina had previously been raped by a man named D.J. Pratt, but had not sought to press charges against him at the time, in spite of the forensic evidence that linked him to the crime.  Regina is raped by Pratt a second time later on, and she seeks out Aiden's help.  Unfortunately for Regina, Pratt left no evidence of the assault this time, but Regina is adamant about pressing charges against him.

Aiden pulls the evidence gathered from the first rape, which includes one of Pratt's hairs.  She breaks the seal on the packet containing Pratt's hair and contemplates planting it at the alleged scene.  Though Aiden does not actually plant the hair, the fact that she breaks the seal on the evidence packet earns her a severe reprimand from her supervisor, Detective Mac Taylor.  Intent on preserving the integrity of the crime lab, Mac feels that he had no other option than to fire Aiden.  Aiden understands Mac's decision, even agreeing with it, because she admits to not knowing if she would resist similar temptation in the future.  Before she leaves, she gets Mac to promise that he will eventually bring Pratt to justice.  Aiden's dismissal from the team leaves a vacancy that is filled by Lindsay Monroe, a transfer from Bozeman, Montana ("Zoo York").

After her dismissal from the crime lab, Aiden is apparently working on getting her private investigator's license while continuing to search for evidence that would conclusively tie Pratt to the Regina Bowen case.  In the penultimate season 2 episode, "Heroes", Aiden, after shadowing Pratt for months, is lured, ambushed, and brutally murdered by him, her body incinerated inside a stolen car. However, knowing that her time is drawing short, she leaves behind critical evidence that she knows will help her former colleagues to close in on Pratt and finally see him arrested.

Aiden's death devastates Mac and the rest of the team, particularly Detective Danny Messer, her former partner. Though she at one time had joked that she was way out of his league, Aiden and Danny shared a very close relationship.

CSI: NY characters
Fictional New York City Police Department detectives
Television characters introduced in 2004
Fictional characters from New York City